Pennsylvania Railroad 520 is a 2-8-2 "Mikado" type steam locomotive built in 1916 by the Baldwin Locomotive Works for the Pennsylvania Railroad for freight duties as a member of the L1s class. In 1942, the locomotive was involved in a devastating boiler explosion incident that required construction of a new, replacement boiler. After being retired in 1957, the locomotive was saved for preservation and placed on display at the Railroad Museum of Pennsylvania in Strasburg, Pennsylvania, and was listed on the National Register of Historic Places in 1979.

Background 
The L1s is a class of 2-8-2 steam locomotives that was developed in 1914 to replace the H9s-class. The L1s used boilers identical to the ones eventually used for Pennsylvania Railroad's famed K4s-class steam locomotives. Most L1s locomotives were moved to other duties when the I1s was introduced in 1924.

History 
No. 520 was built by the Baldwin Locomotive Works in December 1916. While pulling freight from Altoona, Pennsylvania, to Conway, Pennsylvania, on November 14, 1942, during World War 2 the boiler on No. 520 exploded near Cresson. The explosion killed both the engineer and the brakeman, injured the fireman and conductor, and shattered windows on a nearby house. Two occupants of the house were also injured by scalding water and flying embers, which also set a rug on fire. The force of the blast derailed the tender and six tank cars. No. 520 was eventually repaired and placed back into service.

On October 20, 1957, No. 520 pulled a "railfan special" out of Baltimore, Maryland, from Enola to Northumberland, Pennsylvania. After a round trip from Northumberland to Enola, it was retired to the Pennsylvania Railroad's collection of historical locomotives. No. 520 was donated to the Pennsylvania Historical and Museum Commission in December 1979 by the Pennsylvania Railroad's successor Penn Central. It was listed on the National Register of Historic Places on December 17, 1979.

See also 
 List of boiler explosions
 National Register of Historic Places listings in Lancaster County, Pennsylvania

References

Sources 
 
 

2-8-2 locomotives
Collection of the Railroad Museum of Pennsylvania
Individual locomotives of the United States
0520
Railway locomotives on the National Register of Historic Places in Pennsylvania
Standard gauge locomotives of the United States
Railway boiler explosions
National Register of Historic Places in Lancaster County, Pennsylvania
Preserved steam locomotives of Pennsylvania